Paravilla is a genus of bee flies (insects in the family Bombyliidae). There are at least 50 described species in Paravilla.

Species
 List of Paravilla species

References

Further reading

 Diptera.info
 

 
Bombyliidae genera